Andrew R. Lane (born 1960) is chief executive officer, president and vice president of various oil and natural gas corporations. Some of these are: MRC Global Inc., McJunkin Red Man Corporation, Midway-Tristate Corp. and MRC Management Co.

Education
Lane received a B.S. (cum laude) in Mechanical Engineering from Southern Methodist University in 1981. He also attended the six-week Advanced Management Program (AMP) at Harvard Business School in 2000.

Academic and other appointments
Lane is a member of the executive board of the Southern Methodist University School of Engineering.  He also sits on the Southern Methodist University's School of Engineering's executive board, as well as being a member of the Society of Petroleum Engineers and the Society of Exploration Geophysicists. He is a registered professional mechanical engineer in the state of Texas.

Early career
Lane began his career in the oil and gas industry with Gulf Oil, when he served as a field engineer.   He later worked as a production engineer in the firm's Pipeline Design and Permits Group.

Corporations
Lane is CEO and president of the following companies: MRC Global Inc., McJunkin Red Man Corporation, Midway-Tristate Corp., MRC Management Co., The South Texas Supply Company, Inc., Ruffner Realty Company, Landmark Graphics, McJunkin-West Africa Corp., McJunkin-Puerto Rico Corp., McJunkin Red Man Development Corp. (co-CEO), McJunkin Nigeria Limited, Greenbrier Petroleum Corp., Milton Oil & Gas Co., KBR.  Lane held the positions of chief operating officer and executive vice president of Halliburton Co. for three years between December 2004 and December 2007.  At Production Enhancement PSL and Completion Products PSL and Tools/Testing/TCP of Halliburton Energy Services Group, Lane was company vice president.

While working at Hallibuton, Lane managed 50,000+ employees globally, supervising the integration of several mergers and acquisitions.

Calculated compensation
As of 2013 fiscal year, Lane's total calculated compensation was: $3,983,153. As chairman, president and CEO at MRC Global Inc., Lane made $3,983,153 in total compensation. This can be categorized in the following way: $850,000 (salary), $314,500 (bonus), $2,103,923 (stock options), $699,998 (stock) and $14,732 (miscellaneous compensation).

References

1960 births
Living people
Southern Methodist University alumni
American businesspeople in the oil industry
American chief executives